Charles F. Morris (February 12, 1876 in Chippewa Falls, Wisconsin – June 25, 1951) was a member of the Wisconsin State Assembly.

In 1899, he moved to Iron River, Wisconsin. He was a member of the Catholic Order of Foresters.

Career
Morris was a Republican member of the Assembly during the 1903 session. He was also Iron River's City Attorney.

In 1904, he was elected District Attorney of Bayfield County, Wisconsin, and after losing a reelection bid in 1908 by less than thirty votes, was returned to the office in 1912, thereafter serving several terms.

Personal life and death
Morris married Alice Gross of in September 1903, with whom he had three daughters and five sons who were alive at the time of his death. He died in a hospital in Hastings, Minnesota, at the age of 75, and was transported to Washburn, Wisconsin, for burial.

References

Politicians from Chippewa Falls, Wisconsin
People from Bayfield County, Wisconsin
Catholics from Wisconsin
Republican Party members of the Wisconsin State Assembly
19th-century American politicians
19th-century American lawyers
1876 births
Wisconsin city attorneys
1951 deaths